Hrvatski Leskovac is a settlement in the City of Zagreb county, Croatia. As of 2011, it has a population of 2,687. It is connected by the D1 highway. 

In 2019, the settlement's first primary school opened.   

It is also home to a football club, .

See also
Leskovac, Serbia

References

Populated places in the City of Zagreb